Ursula Yovich is an Aboriginal Australian actress and singer.

Early life and education
Yovich was born and grew up in Darwin, Northern Territory, Australia. Her father, Slobodan Jović, was a Serbian immigrant who anglicised his name to Stan Yovich. Her mother is an Aboriginal woman from north-west Arnhem Land near the Blyth River, with the closest community being Maningrida.

Career
Yovich has appeared in more than 20 theatre and musical theatre productions, including Capricornia, Mother Courage and her Children, The Sapphires, Natural Life, Nailed, The Sunshine Club, Jerry Springer the Opera, Nathaniel Storm, and The Adventures of Snugglepot & Cuddlepie and Little Ragged Blossom.

Her film credits include Jindabyne, Australia and Goldstone.

Television credits include Redfern Now, series 2 of the crime drama series Mystery Road, and the comedy series Preppers.

She was the subject of an episode of the SBS documentary series Blaktrax.

Awards and nominations

Wins
In 2002, at the Tudawali Awards, Yovich was the recipient of the inaugural Bob Maza Memorial Award from the Australian Film Commission, which recognised emerging acting talent and support professional development for Indigenous actors.

In 2016 she was awarded the Sidney Myer individual award as a recognition of her outstanding body of work in theatre. She also received the Balnaves Foundation's Indigenous playwrights award later in the same year.

Yovich has won three Helpmann Awards, for Best Female Actor in a Play in 2007 for her performance in Capricornia and for Best Female Actor in a Musical and Best Original Score in 2019 for Barbara and the Camp Dogs.

The 2021 Ensemble Theatre Sandra Bates Director's Award was awarded to Yovich.

Nominations
In 2019 Yovich was nominated for the Nick Enright Prize for Playwriting for her original rock musical comedy, Barbara and the Camp Dogs, co-written with playwright Alana Valentine. The play had its premiere performance at Belvoir St. Theatre in Sydney in 2017, and in the 2017 Sydney Theatre Awards, Yovich was nominated for Best New Australian Work, Best Original Score and Best Female Actor. The work also received a Music Theatre AWGIE nomination.

She has also been nominated multiple times for lead and supporting roles in plays and musicals, and as Best Cabaret Performer in 2010 for Magpie Blues.

Personal life
 Yovich was married to Stewart O'Connell, a lawyer, and the couple has one daughter.

Filmography

Film

Television

Discography
Sketches EP (2004)
Magpie Blues Live

References

External links

 "We are in Australia: Serbian Aboriginal woman". RTS Short documentary about Ursula Yovich authored by Dragan Caran, 16 October 2015

Australian film actresses
Australian musical theatre actresses
Australian television actresses
Australian people of Serbian descent
Helpmann Award winners
Indigenous Australian actresses
Indigenous Australian musicians
Living people
1977 births
21st-century Australian actresses
21st-century Australian singers
21st-century Australian women singers